Oden is an unincorporated community and census-designated place (CDP) in Emmet County in the U.S. state of Michigan. As of the 2010 census, the CDP had a population of 363.  It is located within Littlefield Township.

Geography
Oden is located in southeastern Emmet County, in Littlefield Township, on the north shore of Crooked Lake. U.S. Route 31 passes through the community, leading southwest  to Petoskey, the county seat, and northeast  to Alanson.

The community of Oden was listed as a newly-organized census-designated place for the 2010 census, meaning it now has officially defined boundaries and population statistics for the first time.

Education
In much of the CDP, the school district is Alanson Public Schools. In western parts, the district is Public Schools of Petoskey.

Demographics

References 

Unincorporated communities in Michigan
Unincorporated communities in Emmet County, Michigan
Census-designated places in Emmet County, Michigan
Census-designated places in Michigan